This list includes revolutionary organizations aimed at liberating and unifying Serb-inhabited territories into the historical national state of Serbia—it only includes organizations established after the Principality of Serbia (1815) and before the establishment of Second Yugoslavia (1945).

See also
Serbian Revolution

References

 
Revolutionary organizations
Revolutionary organizations
Serb organizations